Last Night of Amore is a 2023 Italian crime thriller film written and directed by Andrea Di Stefano. The film starring Pierfrancesco Favino, Linda Caridi, Antonio Gerardi, Francesco Di Leva, and Camilla Semino Favro, depicts the story of Franco Amore, who is writing his farewell speech on the night of his retirement. But, who knew that night will turn out to be the longest and most difficult of his entire professional life.

It is selected at the 73rd Berlin International Film Festival in Berlinale Special Gala, where it had its world premiere on 24 February 2023.  It is scheduled for release in cinemas on 9 March 2023.

Cast
 Pierfrancesco Favino as Franco Amore
 Linda Caridi as Viviana
 Antonio Gerardi as Cosimo Forcella
 Francesco Di Leva as Dino
 Camilla Semino Favro as Carabiniere Daria Criscito
 Martin Montero Baez as Ernesto
 Wang Fei as Feifei
 Pang Bo as Mission
 Shi Yang Shi as Chun-Ba
 Xu Ruichi as Gang Ma
 Mauro Milone 
 Carlo Gallo 
 Mauro Negri 
 Fabrizio Rocchi 
 Katia Mironova 
 Chandra Perkins

Release
Last Night of Amore had its world premiere on 24 February 2023 as part of the 73rd Berlin International Film Festival, in Berlinale Special Gala. It is scheduled to release in cinemas on 9 March  2023.

Reception

Vittoria Scarpa reviewing for Cineuropa praised the performance of Pierfrancesco Favino and Linda Caridi writing, "Favino's acting talents are well known, and to note here in particular is the performance of Linda Caridi, who gracefully brings to life a very complex and multifaceted female character." Writing about the director and scriptwriter Andrea Di Stefano, Scarpa stated, "[Di Stefano] directs this thriller/drama with a steady pulse, succeeding in conveying the right amount of suspense and subterranean tension, and with a good narrative rhythm, effectively using the device of re-enacting the same scenes from different points of view."

References

External links
  in Italian 
 
 Last Night of Amore at Berlinale
 

2023 films
2020s crime drama films
2023 crime thriller films
2023 thriller drama films
Italian crime drama films
Italian crime thriller films
Italian thriller drama films
2020s Italian-language films
2020s Italian films